David Lafata (born 18 September 1981) is a Czech former professional footballer who played as a forward.

Club career
From 1992 until 2005 Lafata played for Czech team SK České Budějovice, with a brief spell at FC Vysočina Jihlava in 2002. The striker then moved to Greek club Skoda Xanthi in July 2005, but returned to the Czech Liga in January 2006. After one year at Jablonec, Lafata was transferred to FK Austria Vienna in January 2007 from where he came back to Jablonec in the spring of 2008. For Austria, he scored a goal in a domestic cup final.

In the 2010–11 season, Lafata was top scorer of the Czech First League with 19 goals.

He continued his good run of form into the 2011–12 season, scoring eleven goals in the first seven games, at the end of the autumn half, he scored eighteen goals in sixteen appearances. In April 2012, Lafata broke the Czech First League season scoring record, notching his 23rd goal of the season. He finished season with 25 goals, being top scorer and setting a new record.

In the 2012–13 season, Lafata scored 13 goals in the first 16 games, being top scorer of the league before signing for AC Sparta Prague in the winter break. In March 2014 Lafata scored his 134th goal in the Czech First League, surpassing Horst Siegl as its top all-time scorer. In spring 2013, he scored a goal in the Round of 32 at Stamford Bridge against Chelsea.

At the start of the 2014–15 season, Lafata scored five goals in a 7–0 Champions League qualifying round win over Levadia Tallinn in the home leg in Prague. Continuing his fine form in the Champions League qualifying round, Lafata scored a hat-trick in a 4–2 comeback victory over Malmö FF at home in Prague.
In autumn 2015, Lafata was denied at hat-trick (by the Croatian referee) in Europa League match in Greece against Asteras Tripolis. He scored goal in both away and home match against Schalke 04, as Sparta progressed to the knockout stages.

On 30 July 2017, he scored his 200th league goal in a 1–1 draw against city rival Bohemians 1905.

International career
He scored two goals on his debut for the Czech national team in a 2–1 win against Wales on 2 September 2006. He came on as a substitute after 75 mins and scored within a minute of coming on, the second coming in the 89th minute.

Career statistics

Club
Source: League matches European club matches League matches for Austria

International goals
Scores and results list Czech Republic's goal tally first, score column indicates score after each Lafata goal.

Honours
Austria Wien
 Austrian Cup: 2006–07

Sparta Prague
 Czech First League: 2013–14
 Czech Cup: 2013–14
 Czech Supercup: 2014

Individual
 Czech Footballer of the Year: 2014
 Czech First League top scorer: 2010–11, 2011–12, 2012–13, 2014–15, 2015–16, 2016–17

Records
 Czech First League all-time top goalscorer
 Czech First League most goals in the row: 9 matches / 9 goals
 Most goals in a single Czech First League game: 5 goals
 FK Baumit Jablonec all-time top goalscorer in Czech First League: 88 goals
 SK Dynamo České Budějovice all-time third goalscorer in Czech First League: 27 goals
 Most goals in a single UEFA Champions League qualifying phase: 8 goals (2014–15) (shared with Cléo)
 Most goals in a single UEFA Champions League game: 5 goals (shared with Lionel Messi, Luiz Adriano and Mikhail Mikholap)

References

External links

 
 
 
 

Czech footballers
Czech Republic youth international footballers
Czech Republic under-21 international footballers
Czech Republic international footballers
Czech First League players
Austrian Football Bundesliga players
Super League Greece players
FC Vysočina Jihlava players
FK Jablonec players
SK Dynamo České Budějovice players
FK Austria Wien players
Expatriate footballers in Austria
Czech expatriate sportspeople in Austria
Xanthi F.C. players
Expatriate footballers in Greece
Sportspeople from České Budějovice
1981 births
Living people
UEFA Euro 2012 players
UEFA Euro 2016 players
AC Sparta Prague players
Association football forwards